The 1914 Carlisle Indians football team represented the Carlisle Indian Industrial School as an independent during the 1914 college football season. Led by Pop Warner in his 13th and final season as head coach, the Indians compiled a record of 5–10–1 and were outscored by opponents 207 to 125.

Schedule

See also
 1914 College Football All-America Team

References

Carlisle
Carlisle Indians football seasons
Carlisle Indians football